Mýto is a town in Rokycany District in the Plzeň Region of the Czech Republic. It has about 1,500 inhabitants.

Etymology
The town's name literally means "toll". It refers to its history and location on an important trade route from Prague to Bavaria where the toll was collected.

Geography
The municipal territory extends into three geomorphological regions. The central part with the built-up area lies in the western tip of the Hořovice Uplands. A small part in the north lies in the Křivokrát Highlands.

The Holoubkovský Stream flows through the town. The streams feeds two notable bodies of water in the municipal territory, the ponds Štěpánský and Podmýtský.

History
The first written mention of Mýto and its older church is from 1296. The original settlement was located on a hill around the Church of Saint Stephen. Gradually people began to settle in the area of today's Mýto, where the Church of Saint John the Baptist was built in 1350. At the beginning of the 14th century Mýto became a market town, and in 1905 it became a town.

Until 1918, Mýto was part of the Austrian monarchy (Austria side after the compromise of 1867), in the Rokycany District, one of the 94 Bezirkshauptmannschaften in Bohemia.

Demographics

Transport

The town is located on a regional railway line leading from Beroun to Plzeň and Klatovy.

The D5 motorway passes through the northern part of the territory.

Sights

The Gothic Church of Saint Stephen was built in the 13th century and its Baroque tower dates from the 18th century. Today it serves social and cultural purposes.

The Church of Saint John the Baptist was originally a chapel consecrated to John the Evangelist. During the Thirty Years' War the church was burned down, and in 1680–1682 it was built once again. Many of its Gothic elements were rebuilt in the Baroque style.

Notable people
August Wilhelm Ambros (1816–1876), Austrian music historian

Twin towns – sister cities

Mýto is twinned with:
 Berga, Germany

References

External links

Populated places in Rokycany District
Cities and towns in the Czech Republic